Pete Dunn (born June 26, 1948) is a retired American college baseball coach who was most recently the head coach of the Stetson Hatters baseball team.

Stetson career
Dunn has been the head coach of Stetson's Baseball team for 33 years, and in that time, 72 Stetson players have gone on the play Professional baseball. On July 10, 2013, Dunn received a four-year contract extension that will take him through the 2017 season. In January 2014, he will be inducted into the American Baseball Coaches Hall of Fame held  at the ABCA Convention in Dallas, Texas.  His career record through 2013 is 1,229–793–3 over 34 seasons. He also has eight Atlantic Sun Conference championships, 16 NCAA Regional appearances and six A-Sun coach of the year awards. He is ranked eighth on the active Division I coaches wins list and as of January 2013, 28 in College Baseball History with the most games won, at that time 1202. Dunn retired in December 2016.

Head coaching record
The following is a table of Dunn's yearly records as a collegiate head baseball coach.

See also
List of college baseball coaches with 1,100 wins

Notes

References

External links

Living people
1948 births
Baseball coaches from Florida
Baseball players from Florida
Brevard Tornados baseball players
Georgia Southern Eagles baseball coaches
High school baseball coaches in the United States
Stetson Hatters baseball coaches
Stetson Hatters baseball players